Ludwig Karl Schmarda (23 August 1819 – 7 April 1908) was an Austrian naturalist and traveler, born at Olmütz, Moravia.

Early life and education 
Schmarda was born at Olmütz where he attended the Grammar School and the Philosophical Course at the University of Olomouc. He graduated in 1841. He studied medicine and science at the Josephinum, now part of the Medical University of Vienna , particularly interested in zoology, graduating in 1843 as "Dr Med et Chir.", as well as Magister of Ophthalmology and Gynecology.

Career
In 1843 he was appointed Chief Field Physician to the dragoon regiment, a mounted infantry ("Dragonerregiment"), and at the same time acted as assistant to "special natural history" at the Josephsakademie. During two scientific journeys to the Adriatic Sea, in 1844 and 1846, he made collections of marine life. In 1848, he became a teacher of natural history and geography at the secondary school in Graz. In 1848/49 he lectured at Joanneum on anthropology as a science and represented the School of Agriculture in 1848 and 1850.

In 1850 he was appointed professor at the University of Graz, where he founded the Zoological Museum (in the present day Joanneum Natural History Museum), and in 1852 at Prague.

From 1853–1857 he traveled around the world and in 1862 he was appointed professor at the University of Vienna. For the government he investigated the industry of fisheries on the Austrian (1863–1865) and French (1868) coasts. In 1883 he retired from service, and visited Spain and the African coast in 1884, 1886, and 1887.

Legacy
Schmarda is credited with being the first scientist to have published the observation that microorganisms respond to light, which is considered the foundation for the development of ultraviolet germicidal irradiation.

Published works 
Andeutungen aus dem Seelenleben der Thiere (1846) – Hints on the mental life of animals.
Zur Naturgeschichte der Adria (1852) – On the natural history of the Adriatic Sea.
Die geographische Verbreitung der Thiere (1853) – The geographical distribution of animals
Zur Naturgeschichte Aegyptens (1854) – Natural history of Egypt.
Neue wirbellose Thiere (1859–1861) – New invertebrate animals.
Reise um die Erde (1861) – Journey around the world.
Zoologie (1871; second edition, 1877–1878), (a textbook for higher institutions).

Notes

References 

Attribution:

Austrian naturalists
Austrian male writers
1819 births
1908 deaths
Scientists from Olomouc